This is a list of notable studio potters.  A studio potter is one who is a modern artist or artisan, who either works alone or in a small group, producing unique items of pottery in small quantities, typically with all stages of manufacture carried out by themselves.  Studio pottery includes functional wares such as tableware, cookware and non-functional wares such as sculpture.  Studio potters can be referred to as ceramic artists, ceramists, ceramicists or as an artist who uses clay as a medium.

Australian studio potters

British studio potters

Canadian studio potters

Dutch studio potters

French studio potters

Hungarian studio potters

Japanese studio potters

New Zealand studio potters

Nigerian studio potters

Turkish studio potters 

Füreya Koral
Sencer Sarı
Tankut Öktem
Jale Yılmabaşar

United States studio potters

See also
 American art pottery
 Studio pottery

References

Studio
Studio
Studio
Studio
Studio
Studio
Studio
Potters by nationality
Lists of artists